Valley Symphony Orchestra may refer to:
Valley Symphony Orchestra (LAVC), of the Los Angeles Valley College in California
Valley Symphony Orchestra (McAllen, Texas)